Lake Cootapatamba is a post-glacial tarn in the Kosciuszko National Park, New South Wales, Australia.

Lake Cootapatamba is located at 2,048 metres, which is about 800 metres south of the summit of Mount Kosciuszko, the highest peak in Australia. It is the highest elevation lake in Australia. It is 400 metres long with a maximum depth of about 5 metres.

References

Cootapatamba
Snowy Mountains
Kosciuszko National Park